The Maranhão gubernatorial election of 1986 as held in Brazilian state of Maranhão on November 15, alongside Brazil's general elections. PMDB candidate, Epitácio Cafeteira, was elected on November 15, 1986.

1986 Brazilian gubernatorial elections

1986